Imperial Entanglements is a supplement for Star Wars Miniatures Battles published by West End Games.

Contents
Imperial Entanglements is a collection containing nine adventure scenarios.

Reception
Andrew Rilstone reviewed Imperial Entanglements for Arcane magazine, rating it a 6 out of 10 overall. Rilstone comments that "There's [...] a tree-top battle between forces that survived the battle of Endor, in which you get to kill large numbers of Ewoks. It must surely be the high-point of this game."

References

Star Wars games